Eufernaldia sinaloellus is a moth in the family Crambidae. It was described by Schaus in 1922. It is found in Mexico.

References

Ancylolomiini
Moths described in 1922